Miriam Waddington (née Dworkin; 23 December 1917 – 3 March 2004) was a Canadian poet, short story writer and translator. She was part of a Montreal literary circle that included F. R. Scott, Irving Layton and Louis Dudek.

Biography
Miriam Waddington was born in Winnipeg, Manitoba, she studied English at the University of Toronto (B.A. 1939) and social work at the University of Pennsylvania (M.A.). She worked for many years as a social worker in Montreal, Quebec. She later relocated to the then Toronto suburb of North York, where she worked for North York Family Services. In 1964, she joined the English department at York University. She retired in 1983.

She died in Vancouver, British Columbia, Canada on 3 March 2004 after suffering a stroke in late February. After her death, much of her own works and personal library were donated by her sons to the archives of Simon Fraser University in Burnaby, British Columbia. The donation was a significant and appreciated endowment. Her archival fonds is held at Library and Archives Canada in Ottawa.

Honours
Miriam Waddington was awarded Borestone Mountain Awards for best poetry in 1963, 1966, and 1974. She received the J.J. Segal Award in 1972. She was the Canada Council Exchange Poet to Wales in 1980, and served as writer-in-residence at the Windsor Public Library and at the University of Ottawa.

Waddington received honorary doctorates from Lakehead University in 1975 and York University in 1985.

Her poem "Jacques Cartier in Toronto" is featured on the back of the Canadian $100 bill released in 2004.

Bibliography

Poetry
Green World. Montreal: First Statement, 1945.
The Second Silence. Toronto: Ryerson, 1955.
The Season's Lovers. Toronto: Ryerson, 1958.
Four Poems. n.p.: n.p., 196-?
The Glass Trumpet. Toronto: Oxford University Press, 1966.
Flying with Milton. Santa Barbara, Calif.: Unicorn Press, 1969.
Say Yes. Toronto: Oxford University Press, 1969.
Dream Telescope. London: Anvil Press Poetry, 1972.
Driving Home: Poems New and Selected. Toronto: Oxford University Press, 1972.
The Price of Gold. Toronto: Oxford University Press, 1976.
Mister Never. Winnipeg: Turnstone Press, 1978.
The Visitants. Toronto: Oxford University Press, 1981.
Collected Poems. Toronto: Oxford University Press, 1986.
The Last Landscape. Toronto: Oxford University Press, 1992.
Canada: Romancing the Land - 1996
Advice to the Young

Fiction
Summer at Lonely Beach and Other Stories. Oakville, ON: Mosaic Press, 1982.

Non-fiction
A.M. Klein. Toronto: Copp Clark Publishing, 1970.
Folklore in the Poetry of A.M. Klein. St. John's, NF: Memorial University, 1981.
Apartment Seven: Essays New and Selected. Toronto: Oxford University Press, 1989.

Edited
Waddington, Miriam, ed. The Collected Poems of A.M. Klein. Toronto: Mc-Graw-Hill Ryerson, 1974.
Waddington, Miriam, ed. John Sutherland: Essays, Controversies and Poems. Toronto: McClelland & Stewart, 1972.

Except where noted, bibliographical information courtesy Brock University.

References

External links 
 100 Canadian Poets
 The Bank of Canada - $100 Note, Background Information
 Miriam Waddington's life achievements, awards, selected publications and books in print
 Works at Open Library
 Waddington at The Canadian Encyclopedia
 Archives of Miriam Waddington (Miriam Waddington fonds, R4777) ate held at Library and Archives Canada 

1917 births
2004 deaths
20th-century Canadian poets
Jewish Canadian writers
Canadian women short story writers
Canadian women poets
Writers from Winnipeg
University of Pennsylvania School of Social Policy and Practice alumni
University of Toronto alumni
York University alumni
20th-century Canadian women writers
20th-century Canadian short story writers